Justin Gimelstob and Nicolas Kiefer were the defending champions, but Kiefer did not compete this year. Gimelstob teamed up with Ashley Fisher and lost in quarterfinals to Yves Allegro and Michael Kohlmann.

Jared Palmer and Pavel Vízner won the title by defeating Jiří Novák and Petr Pála. Palmer and Vízner were leading 5–1 in the first set until Novák was forced to retire due to a rib injury.

Seeds

Draw

Draw

References

External links
 Official results archive (ATP)
 Official results archive (ITF)

2004 Japan Open Tennis Championships